Derrywarragh Island is a boulder clay island on Lough Neagh, Northern Ireland. It is linked by a bridge to Maghery, County Armagh. Most of the island is wet grassland. There are also areas of wet woodland, marshes and swamps. The island is also regularly the home of wintering and breeding birds.

History
On entering the River Blackwater barges used to sail down the river for about three miles to Lough Neagh at Maghery, where they navigated the mouth of the River by Derrywarragh Peninsula, causing endless delays through silting, flooding and blockages. In 1802 work started under the direction of Daniel Monks to excavate a short channel from the eastern bank of the Blackwater straight to the lough shore through the lower section of Derrywarragh Peninsula thus turning it into what is now Derrywarragh Island. This cut, "the Maghery Cut", finished in 1803, allowed vessels to avoid the sand bars at the river’s mouth. A pontoon bridge was erected and was later replaced by a fixed bridge to allow access onto Derrywarragh Island by the main resident of the island who owns a livestock haulage business and was noticing weakness as the lorry passed over the bridge.

Places of interest
The O'Connors Stronghold can be found on the north-east end of the island. It is a 17th-century fortified house. According to Craigavon Museum Services, it was probably a "watchtower to protect the mouth of the River Blackwater".

Sport
The island is also the home of Maghery Sean MacDermott's GAA club.

References

Islands of County Armagh
Lough Neagh
Lake islands of Northern Ireland